Glenn David Bujnoch ((born December 20, 1953) is a former American football offensive lineman who played in the National Football League (NFL) from 1976 through 1984.

Early life
Bujnoch attended Mount Carmel High School in Houston, Texas.

He played college football at Texas A&M University.

Professional career
Bujnoch was selected in the second round of the 1976 NFL Draft by the Cincinnati Bengals.

In his rookie year with the Bengals, he played in all 14 games, starting one. In 1977, he became a starter, and from 1977 through 1980 (four seasons), he played in 60 games, starting all but four. Also in 1977, he scored his only NFL touchdown on a four-yard run

In 1981, he was limited to six games (starting five), but it was a great year for the Bengals as Bujnoch was a member of the Bengals team that won the AFC Championship and played in Super Bowl XVI.

He played in nine games off the bench in 1982, his seventh and last with the Bengals.

He signed with the Tampa Bay Buccaneers and played with them in 1983 and 1984, playing a total of 14 games, starting five. Bujnoch was cut by Tampa Bay before the 1985 season.

Personal life
Glenn Bujnoch and his wife, Sue, reside in Cincinnati, Ohio. They are the parents of former University of Cincinnati offensive lineman and three-year starter (2005–07) Digger Bujnoch, who signed with several NFL teams but never appeared in a regular season NFL game, and Austen Bujnoch, also a three-year starter (2011–13) for the Bearcats.

References

1953 births
Living people
American football offensive guards
Texas A&M Aggies football players
Cincinnati Bengals players
Tampa Bay Buccaneers players
Players of American football from Houston